Geotrupes blackburnii, or Blackburn's earth boring beetle, is a species of earth-boring scarab beetle in the family Geotrupidae.

Subspecies
These two subspecies belong to the species Geotrupes blackburnii:
 Geotrupes blackburnii blackburnii (Fabricius, 1781)
 Geotrupes blackburnii excrementi Say, 1823

References

Further reading

 

Geotrupidae
Articles created by Qbugbot
Beetles described in 1781